Ishtar TV (after the  Assyro-Babylonian goddess, Ishtar) is an Assyrian broadcasting channel which has its headquarters in Ankawa, Iraq. It was established by Sarkis Aghajan and was led by George Mansour, who was Ishtar TV's first General Manager, in 2005. The network broadcasts mostly in Syriac, but Arabic and Kurdish are heard throughout the day as well.

Politically, the channel is affiliated with the Chaldean Syriac Assyrian Popular Council.

See also

 ANB SAT
 Suroyo TV
 Suryoyo Sat
 Ashur TV
 KBSV
 Assyria TV

External links
 

Aramaic-language television channels
Television stations in Iraq
Mass media in Ankawa
Television channels and stations established in 2005
2005 establishments in Iraq